Amplypterus celebensis is a species of moth of the  family Sphingidae. It is known from Indonesia (Seram and Sulawesi).

Subspecies
Amplypterus celebensis celebensis (Sulawesi)
Amplypterus celebensis seramensis Inoue, 1999 (Seram)

References

Amplypterus
Moths described in 1906
Moths of Indonesia